Gabriela "Elly" Lerch Bašić (Zagreb, September 3, 1908 – Zagreb, February 25, 1998) was a Croatian music pedagogue and pianist.

Early years
Elly Bašić was born in Zagreb on September 3, 1908, in a Jewish family, to Rikard and Dorotea Lerch. Her father became director-general of Croatian Post. She had one brother, Ivan. She graduated in piano at the Zagreb Academy of Music and studied composition and conducting.

Career
In 1929, she founded the Beethoven Experimental School of Music with her first husband. Ivo Prišlin, which she directed until 1945 and where she taught piano and music theory. She also taught piano and theoretical subjects at the City Music School in Zagreb, and she also worked as an assistant at the Zagreb Academy of Music, lecturer at the Theater Academy in Zagreb, and assistant professor at the Sarajevo Music Academy. For many years, she was a permanent external associate of the Institute of Ethnology and Folklore Research in Zagreb. In 1965, she founded the Functional Music School, which is today known as the Elly Bašić Music School.

Music pedagogy
For several decades, Bašić dealt with the topic of creativity in children as a natural gift and the possibility of maintaining and developing that creativity in youth and adults. She argued that actions like lullabies, nursery rhymes, games, chants, sports cheering and mother musical-speech-motor elements influenced positively the expression of children and adults alike, especially emotionally inhibited children and children with disabilities. This science was defined as Functional Music Pedagogy (FMP), devoted to not just music education, but to help the development of the child's personality through music. However, she argued that every child had a music ear and rhythm, which were instrumental in the development of their creativity.

Bašić presented the results of her research in a series of thirty papers at numerous scientific conferences in Yugoslavia and abroad, and a particularly famous and successful exhibition named "Musical Expression of the Child", which was set at the UNESCO office in Geneva in 1955. Her textbook Sedam nota sto divota (Seven Notes and a Hundred Wonders) was published in 18 editions over the course of 18 years, and bestseller in the field of music-pedagogy in Croatia during that time.

Personal life
She married the pianist and composer Ivo Prišlin in 1929, with whom she had a son, the Croatian actor Relja Bašić; the marriage did not last long because she discovered an affair her husband was having with a student. She married the conductor and pianist Mladen Bašić, who adopted her son Relja; it is said that her marriage saved her from the Ustaše regime during World War II.

Death
Bašić died on February 25, 1998, in Zagreb. She is buried at the Mirogoj City Cemetery in Zagreb.

References

1908 births
1998 deaths
Croatian Jews
Croatian musicians
Croatian pianists
Burials at Mirogoj Cemetery